The Man Who Came to Dinner is a 1939 play written by George S. Kaufman and Moss Hart.

The Man Who Came to Dinner may also refer to:

 The Man Who Came to Dinner (1942 film), starring Monty Woolley
 The Man Who Came to Dinner (1972 film), a Hallmark Hall of Fame TV movie